John Cain may refer to:

 John Cain (34th Premier of Victoria) (1882–1957), Australian politician
 John Cain (41st Premier of Victoria) (1931–2019), Australian politician, son of the above
 John Cain (lawyer), Victorian Government Solicitor (2006–2011), grandson of the 34th and son of the 41st premier of Victoria
 John Edward Cain (1887–1981), American politician
 John J. Cain (1861–1937), American mayor of Bayonne, New Jersey
 John Paul Cain (1936–2017), American golfer
 John Vincent Cain (1907–1940), British fraudster
 Johnny Cain (1908–1977), American football player, college sports coach and administrator

See also
John McCain (disambiguation)
John Du Cane (born 1949), writer
John Caine (disambiguation)
Jonathan Cain (born 1950), American musician
John Kane (disambiguation)